The 2018 IFSC Climbing World Championships, the 15th edition, were held in Innsbruck, Austria from 6 to 16 September 2018.
The championships consisted of lead, speed, bouldering, paraclimbing, and combined events.

Medal winners overview

Lead 

The lead competition was the first event held at the 2018 World Championships. The women's qualification took place on the opening day, 6 September, at the Kletterzentrum, and the men's was held the following day at the same location. Women's semi-final and final were held on 8 September and the respective men's competitions the next day both at the Olympiaworld.

Women 

101 athletes attended the women's lead competition. In the final penultimate climber Jessica Pilz was the first to top the route. Janja Garnbret came out as the last climber and topped the route as well. As both climbers had the same first tiebreaker by virtue of having topped the semi-final route the ranking was decided by their time on the final route, which Pilz had climbed faster and thus was awarded the gold medal. Bronze went to Kim Ja-in.

Men 

124 athletes attended the men's lead competition. Adam Ondra and Jakob Schubert achieved the same score (36+) on the final route. Innsbruck-born Schubert won the gold medal due to his better tie-breaker, having achieved the better score in the semi-final. The bronze medal went to Alex Megos (33.5)

Speed 

The speed competitions took place in the Olympiaworld with the qualification rounds and the finals both being held on 13 September.

Women 

94 athletes competed in the women's speed climbing event. Aleksandra Rudzinska (7.56s) won the final of the speed competition over her Polish countrywoman Anna Brozek (7.91s). Mariia Krasavina won the bronze medal in the small final against Aleksandra Kalucka, who false started.

Men 

125 athletes competed in the men's speed competition. Reza Alipour (5.630s) won the final against Bassa Mawem (fell). In the small final Stanislav Kokorin (6.028s) won against QiXin Zhong (fell) and thus claimed the bronze medal.

Bouldering 

The bouldering event was held over four days. The qualifying took place at Kletterzentrum with the women's qualification held on 11 September and the men's on 12 September. Semi-finals and finals were held at the Olympiaworld on 14 September for the women and 15 September for the men.

Women 

112 athletes attended the women's bouldering competition. In the bouldering final lead finalists Janja Garnbret, Akiyo Noguchi, and Jessica Pilz made another appearance. The World Cup bouldering seasonal winner Miho Nonaka, reigning world champion Petra Klingler, and Staša Gejo completed the final. Garnbret won gold over Noguchi and Gejo won bronze.

Men 

150 athletes attended the men's bouldering competition, making it the largest individual event at the World Championship. Kai Harada (4T4z 7 6) won the Gold medal over Jongwon Chon (3T4z 9 10) and Gregor Vezonik (3T4z 9 17). The reigning champion, Tomoa Narasaki, and the World Cup seasonal winner, Jernej Kruder, missed the cut to the final.

Combined 

In the Combined competition the six most successful athletes of the previous competitions competed against each other in Speed, Bouldering and Lead. The athletes were selected by multiplying each athletes rank from the three individual competitions. The six climbers with the lowest scores determined by this method were invited to compete in the Combined final. In the final itself the athletes were again ranked by multiplying their rank in the Speed, Bouldering and Lead portion with a lower score leading to a better Combined rank.

The women's and men's combined final were both held at the Olympiaworld, the women's on 15 September and the men's on 16 September.

Women

Men

References

External links 

 
 IFSC: IFSC Climbing World Championship (results)

IFSC Climbing World Championships
World Climbing Championships
World Climbing Championships
September 2018 sports events in Europe
International sports competitions hosted by Austria